The SIU Edwardsville Cougars women's soccer team represent Southern Illinois University Edwardsville (SIUE) in the Ohio Valley Conference of NCAA Division I soccer. The Cougars play their home matches on Bob Guelker Field at Ralph Korte Stadium located in the southwest corner of the SIUE campus in Edwardsville, Illinois. Derek Burton has been head coach since 2008.

History
The program was started by Lori Stark in 1981 as a club team and was elevated to varsity status the following year. Stark departed after the 1983 season and was replaced by a series of co-head coaches.

In 1984 and 1985, the program was led by Mike Kelly and head softball coach Cindy Jones. Jones was replaced in 1986 by Ed Huneke, who also became the new men's head coach. Kelly left after five seasons and was replaced in 1989 by Brian Korbesmeyer. 

In 1990, Korbesmeyer became the sole head coach, a position he held through 2002, leading the Cougars to two Great Lakes Valley Conference (GLVC) titles and three trips to the NCAA Division II Women's Soccer Championship tournament. 

Cougar alumna Lynda Bowers became head coach in 2003. She led the Cougars to two more GLVC championships and two more NCAA tournaments before leaving the program after the 2007 season. 

Derek Burton assumed the reins of the program in 2008 and led it into Division I and the Ohio Valley Conference (OVC). 

In 2014, Burton's Cougars tied for the regular season OVC championship, then won the conference tournament to become the school's first entry in the NCAA Division I Women's Soccer Championship. Playing at heavily favored Kentucky, the Cougars held the Wildcats to a scoreless tie through regulation time and two extra periods before falling on penalty kicks.

The 2016 squad finished the regular season in fourth place with a record of only 8–7–4 (6–3–1 OVC). They got through the first round of the OVC tournament by besting Austin Peay on penalty kicks 5–4, sending them to the semifinals at top-seeded Murray State. The Racers had not lost on their home field since October 2014, but the Cougars took the victory 2–1 with 11 seconds left in the first overtime period. In the tournament final, they faced co-champions Eastern Kentucky. The Cougars scored early, then successfully argued that the referee had not let the goalkeeper get set on a penalty kick. Goalkeeper Juli Rossi blocked the re-try, and SIUE then held on to win 1–0 for their second title in three years.  Playing in the NCAA tournament at heavily favored and 11th ranked Notre Dame, the Cougars held the Fighting Irish to a scoreless tie through regulation time and two extra periods. In the penalty kicks, Rossi made two saves, while the SIUE women nailed 5 of six to win 5–4 and became only the second OVC team to advance to the NCAA second round  where they lost to Northwestern 1–0 at Duke.

All-Americans
Two players have been named All-Americans for their play at SIUE.

Janece Friederich, 1996 First Team, 1998 Second Team
Elizabeth Valenti, 2007 Second Team

One player has been named to the NSCAA Women's University Division Scholar All-American Teams.

Samantha Jones, 2014 Third Team

Record By Year

See also
SIU Edwardsville Cougars men's soccer

References

External links
 
 https://www.siue.edu/

NCAA Division I women's soccer teams
Soccer, Women's
Soccer clubs in Illinois